The Women's 200 metres competition at the 1968 Summer Olympics in Mexico City, Mexico was held at the University Olympic Stadium on October 17–18.

Competition format

The Women's 200m competition consisted of heats (Round 1), semifinals and a Final. The three fastest competitors from each race in the heats qualified for the semifinals along with the fastest overall competitor not already qualified. The four fastest competitors from each of the semifinal races qualified for the final.

Records
Prior to the competition, the existing World and Olympic records were as follows.

Results

Round 1
Qual. rule: first 3 of each heat (Q) plus the fastest time (q) qualified.

Heat 1

Heat 2

Heat 3

Heat 4

Heat 5

Semi-final

Heat 1

Heat 2

Final

References

External links
 Official Olympic Report, la84foundation.org. Retrieved August 15, 2012.

Athletics at the 1968 Summer Olympics
200 metres at the Olympics
1968 in women's athletics
Women's events at the 1968 Summer Olympics